Stephen Ahorlu (born 5 September 1988) is a Ghanaian former professional footballer who played as a goalkeeper and works as a goalkeeping coach for Heart of Lions.

Club career
Ahorlu was born in Kpandu.

He returned to his former club Heart of Lions ahead of the 2013–14 season. In December he received criticism from fans for poor performances.

Ahorlu retired in 2015 after sustaining a "career-threatening injury" in 2013.

International career
On 13 May 2010, Ahorlu earned his call-up in the Ghana national team for the 2010 FIFA World Cup.

Post-playing career
In 2017 Ahorlu was appointed goalkeeping coach at his former club Heart of Lions, playing in Ghana's Division One, the country's second tier.

References

1988 births
Living people
Ghanaian footballers
Association football goalkeepers
Ghana international footballers
2010 FIFA World Cup players
Israeli Premier League players
Heart of Lions F.C. players
Hapoel Ashkelon F.C. players
Emmanuel Stars F.C. players
Medeama SC players
Ghanaian expatriate footballers
Ghanaian expatriate sportspeople in Israel
Expatriate footballers in Israel